Shaikh Isa Palace is a palace in western Bahrain. The Palace lies just northeast of Al Rawda Palace in Riffa.

Palaces in Bahrain